Râușor or Râușorul may refer to the following places in Romania:

 Râușor, a village in the commune Mândra, Brașov County
 Râușor Dam, a dam in Argeș County
 Râușor, a tributary of the Băiaș in Vâlcea County
 Râușor (Bratia), a tributary of the Bratia in Argeș County
 Râușor (Breazova), a river in Hunedoara County
 Râușor (Dâmbovița), a tributary of the Dâmbovița in Argeș County
 Râușor, a tributary of the Lungșoara in Sibiu County
 Râușor (Mara), a river in Maramureș County
 Râușor (Râul Târgului), a tributary of the Râul Târgului in Argeș County
 Râușor (Strei), a river in Hunedoara County